Colleen is an Irish feminine given name anglicised from Cailín meaning girl. 

Colleen may also refer to:

Entertainment 
 Colleen (1927 film), a 1927 comedy film starring Madge Bellamy
 Colleen (1936 film), a 1936 Warner Bros. musical
 Colleen (musician), electronic music composer Cécile Schott (born 1976)
 Colleen (album), a 1983 release by Colleen Hewett
 Colleen (song), by the band The Heavy
 "Colleen," a song from the EP Joanna Newsom and the Ys Street Band by Joanna Newsom
 "Colleen," a song from the album Living with the Living by Ted Leo and the Pharmacists
 "Colleen", a song by Griffin House (musician), from his 2013 album Balls

Ships and boats 
 HMS Colleen, two ships of Britain's Royal Navy
 Colleen Class, a sailing boat once raced in Dublin Bay
 Colleen (rowboat), a rowboat used on Okanagan Lake in Canada

Other uses 
 Colleen, Virginia, an unincorporated community in Nelson County
 Chicago Colleens, a former baseball team in the All-American Girls Professional Baseball League
 Colleen, the design code name for the Atari 800 computer

See also